Culo may refer to:
Čulo, a Croatian surname
"Culo (song)", a song by rapper Pitbull from his 2004 album M.I.A.M.I..
Culo (book), a coffee-table book by photographer Raphael Mazzucco